Swan City Mustangs was a State Basketball League (SBL) club based in Perth, Western Australia. The club fielded a team in both the Men's SBL (MSBL) and Women's SBL (WSBL). The club was a division of the now-defunct Swan Districts Basketball Association (SDBA), the major administrative basketball organisation in the City of Swan. The Mustangs played their home games at Swan Park Leisure Centre.

Club history

Background
Swan Districts Basketball Association (SDBA) was founded in 1964. Swans entered the District Competition in 1974, with the men's team winning the grand final that year under coach Bob Muir. The association's next A-grade premiership came in 1982 when the women's team were victorious under the guidance of coach Fred Pesqua. The women's team won again in 1983, while the men's team won their second A-grade premiership in 1985. Swan Districts continued on in the District Competition—now known as the "State League"—in 1986 before sitting out the 1987 and 1988 A-grade seasons.

Formation of the SBL (1989)
1989 saw the formation of the State Basketball League (SBL) with both a men's and women's competition. Swan Districts entered a team into both the MSBL and WSBL, with both teams recording winless inaugural seasons.

Dominant SBL force (1990–1996)
In 1990, the Mustangs women saw just one win, while the men earned the MSBL minor premiership with a first-place finish and a 23–3 record. In 1991, both teams collected minor premierships and earned grand final berths. In the WSBL Grand Final, the Mustangs defeated the Perth Redbacks 79–66; and in the MSBL Grand Final, the Mustangs defeated the Souwest Slammers 123–120.

In 1992, the women made their second straight WSBL Grand Final after again collecting the minor premiership. In the championship decider however, they were defeated by the Wanneroo Wolves 74–64. In 1993, the women won their third straight minor premiership and advanced through to a third straight grand final. In the 1993 WSBL Grand Final, the Mustangs defeated the Stirling Senators 109–51 to win their second championship. In 1994, the women won their fourth straight minor premiership, but failed to make the WSBL Grand Final. The men meanwhile finished the regular season in second place and advanced through to the 1994 MSBL Grand Final. In the championship decider however, they were defeated by the Perry Lakes Hawks 107–86.

In 1995, the women finished the regular season in second place and advanced through to the WSBL Grand Final, where they faced the first-seeded Wanneroo Wolves. In what was the first and only best-of-three grand final series, the Wolves defeated the Mustangs 2–0, winning 83–49 in Game 1 and 60–55 in Game 2. In 1996, the women collected their fifth minor premiership in six years and advanced through to their fifth grand final in six years. In the 1996 WSBL Grand Final, the Mustangs defeated the Willetton Tigers 66–61 to win their third championship.

Final years in SBL (1999–2003)
In 1999, the Mustangs returned to the SBL after a two-year hiatus. In their first season back, the women finished in last place on the ten-team ladder with a 1–26 record, while the men finished 13th out of 14 teams with a 5–21 record. In 2000, the women went winless in the 11-team WSBL, while the men finished in sixth place in the seven-team West Conference with a 5–14 record. In 2001, the women had their second straight winless season, while the men also finished last with a 2–24 record. In 2002, the women had their third straight winless season, while the men finished 13th out of 14 teams with a 4–22 record. Despite the record, Mustangs captain Jarrad Mohr was named joint Men's MVP in 2002 alongside Kurt Slabolepszy of the Stirling Senators. Mohr joined Ken Epperson (1993) as the only Mustangs players to earn MVP honours. In 2003, the women fared slightly better than their previous four seasons, finishing in fourth place with a 6–10 record on the six-team WSBL North ladder. The men meanwhile earned an 11–8 record to finish in third place on the seven-team MSBL North ladder.

In conjunction with their fledgeling form on the court, Swan Districts Basketball Association was in financial difficulty with increasing debt to Basketball Western Australia—reportedly in excess of $40,000. As a result, the association ceased operations following the 2003 season.

Season-by-season results

References

Basketball teams in Western Australia
State Basketball League teams
Basketball teams established in 1989
1989 establishments in Australia